Stephen T. Kay (born 1963) is an American actor, director, and writer of film and television.

Career
He has directed the films Get Carter and Boogeyman. as well as directing episodes of Saved, The Shield, Friday Night Lights, Sons of Anarchy, Quantico, The Punisher, Yellowstone, Coyote, Big Sky , Mayor of Kingstown and 1883. Beginning his career as an actor, his acting credits include Quantum Leap, Murder, She Wrote, Party of Five and regular roles in Deadly Games and General Hospital.

Personal life
In 2013, Kay became engaged to Piper Perabo, star of Covert Affairs, a show Kay directed and produced. They wed on July 26, 2014, in New York City.

Kay had previously dated Desperate Housewives actresses Teri Hatcher and Eva Longoria, whom he had directed in the 2004 television movie The Dead Will Tell, for about a year each – Longoria in 2004 and Hatcher during 2006–07. He has a daughter from a previous relationship.

References

External links

1963 births
American people of New Zealand descent
American film directors
American film producers
American male screenwriters
American television directors
Living people
New Zealand emigrants to the United States
Date of birth missing (living people)
Place of birth missing (living people)